The St. Martha's AME Church and Parsonage in Highland, Kansas is a historic site at the southwest corner of Main and Canada.  It was built in 1882 and added to the National Register of Historic Places in 2000.

It includes the St. Martha's A.M.E. Church, built c.1882, a one-story gable roof building with clapboard exterior.  It also includes a one-and-a-half-story parsonage, also built c.1882.

References

Buildings and structures in Doniphan County, Kansas
Methodist churches in Kansas
Churches on the National Register of Historic Places in Kansas
Churches completed in 1882
National Register of Historic Places in Doniphan County, Kansas